Charlos Heights or Charlo's Heights (Salish: nkʷalíʔps ) is a census-designated place (CDP) in Ravalli County, Montana, United States. The population was 120 at the 2010 census.

Geography

The area south of Charlos Heights is called ɫmq̓ʷcn̓é in Salish.

Demographics

References

Census-designated places in Ravalli County, Montana
Census-designated places in Montana